Northern Transylvania was the region of the Kingdom of Romania that during World War II, as a consequence of the August 1940 territorial agreement known as the Second Vienna Award, became part of the Kingdom of Hungary.

In October 1944, Soviet and Romanian forces gained control of the territory, and by March 1945 Northern Transylvania returned to Romanian administration. After the war, this was confirmed by the Paris Peace Treaties of 1947.

Background

The region has a varied history. It was once the nucleus of the Kingdom of Dacia (82 BC–106 AD). In 106 AD the Roman Empire conquered the territory, systematically exploiting its resources. After the Roman legions withdrew in 271 AD, it was overrun by a succession of various tribes, bringing it under the control of the Carpi, Visigoths, Huns, Gepids, Avars, and Slavs. During the 9th century, Bulgarians ruled Transylvania.

The Magyars conquered much of Central Europe at the end of the 9th century and for almost six hundred years, Transylvania was a voivodeship in the Kingdom of Hungary. After the Battle of Mohács in 1526 and the Hungarian defeat by the Ottomans, Transylvania became a semi-independent principality (the Principality of Transylvania) under local Hungarian nobility rule, but owing suzerainty to the Ottoman Empire. It then became a province (Principality/Grand Principality of Transylvania) of the Habsburg monarchy/Austrian Empire as a Land of the Hungarian Crown, and after 1848, and again from 1867 to 1918 it was incorporated into the Kingdom of Hungary within the Austro-Hungarian Empire. The dual monarchy dissolved after World War I.

The ethnic Romanians, who formed the majority population of Transylvania, elected representatives who proclaimed the Union with Romania on 1 December 1918. The Proclamation of Union at Alba Iulia was adopted by the Deputies of the Romanians from Transylvania during the Great National Assembly of Alba Iulia, supported one month later by the vote of the Deputies of the Transylvanian Saxons during the Mediaș Assembly. By Spring 1919, during the Hungarian–Romanian War, Transylvania came under administrative control of Romania. Eventually in June 1920 the Treaty of Trianon assigned Transylvania to the Kingdom of Romania.

The text of the Second Vienna Award 
  The final route of the border line, which separates Romania from Hungary, will correspond to the one marked on the geographical map attached here. A Romanian-Hungarian commission will determine the details of the route on the spot.
  The Romanian territory assigned to Hungary will be evacuated by Romanian troops within 15 days and handed over in good order. The different phases of the evacuation and the occupation, as well as their modalities will be fixed within a Romanian-Hungarian commission. The Hungarian and Romanian governments will ensure that the evacuation and occupation are carried out in full order. 
  All Romanian subjects, settled on this day on the territory to be ceded by Romania, acquire Hungarian nationality without any formalities. They will be allowed to opt in favor of the Romanian nationality within 6 months. Those people who will exercise this right, will leave the Hungarian territory within an additional period of 1 year and will be allowed to move into Romania. They will be able to take, without any hindrance, their movable property, to liquidate their immovable property, until the moment of their departure, and to take with them the resulting product. If the liquidation fails, these people will be compensated by Hungary. Hungary will resolve all issues related to the transplantation of optants in a broad and accommodating manner. 
  Romanian subjects of Hungarian race, established in the territory ceded in 1919 by Hungary to Romania and which remained under the sovereignty of the state, receive the right to opt for Hungarian nationality, within a period of 6 months. The principles set out in paragraph 3 shall also apply to people exercising this right.
  The Hungarian government solemnly undertakes to fully assimilate the Romanian people with other Hungarian subjects, who, on the basis of the above arbitration, will acquire Hungarian nationality. On the other hand, the Romanian government takes the same solemn commitment regarding its Hungarian subjects, who will remain on the Romanian territory. 
  The details resulting from the transfer of sovereignty will be regulated by a direct agreement between the Romanian and Hungarian governments. 
  Should any difficulties or doubts arise during the application of this arbitration, the Romanian and Hungarian governments will seek to reach an agreement directly. If no agreement is reached, the dispute will be submitted to the governments of the Reich and Italy, which will adopt a final solution.

Second Vienna Award

In June 1940, Romania was forced (as a consequence of Molotov–Ribbentrop Pact) to submit to a Soviet ultimatum and accept the annexation by the Soviet Union of Bessarabia and Northern Bukovina. Subsequently, Hungary attempted to regain Transylvania, which it had lost in the immediate aftermath of World War I. Germany and Italy pressured both Hungary and Romania to resolve the situation in a bilateral agreement. The two delegations met in Turnu Severin on August 16, but the negotiations failed due to a demand for a  territory from the Hungarian side and only an offer of population exchange from the Romanian side. To impede a Hungarian-Romanian war in their "hinterland", the Axis powers pressured both governments to accept their arbitration: the Second Vienna Award, signed on August 30.

Historian Keith Hitchins summarizes the situation created by the award:
Far from settling matters, the Vienna Award had exacerbated relations between Romania and Hungary. It did not solve the nationality problem by separating all Magyars from all Romanians. Some 1,150,000 to 1,300,000 Romanians, or 48 percent to over 50 percent of the population of the ceded territory, depending upon whose statistics are used, remained north of the new frontier, while about 500,000 Magyars (other Hungarian estimates go as high as 800,000, Romanian as low as 363,000) continued to reside in the south.

The Hungarian population was in the unusual situation of being an overwhelming majority in an area of southeastern Transylvania, deep within Romania and far from the Hungarian border (the area, known as Székely Land, is today mainly in Harghita, Covasna, and Mureș counties), and not simply only in certain areas next to the Hungarian border as in the case of Czechoslovakia and Bačka or Baranya. The solution decided upon was to gouge a claw-shaped corridor through northwestern Romania, including a large Romanian-populated area, in order to incorporate this Hungarian-majority area within Hungary.

Population of Northern Transylvania, as per 1930 Romanian census:

Before the arbitration, in 1940, according to the Romanian estimates, in Northern Transylvania there were 1,304,903 Romanians (50.2%) and 978,074 (37.1%) Hungarians. One year later, after the arbitration, according to the Hungarian census, the population of Northern Transylvania had dissimilar ratios, it counted 53.5% Hungarians and 39.1% Romanians.

The dissimilar ratios were caused by a combination of complex factors such as migration, the assimilation of Jews and bilingual speakers. According to Hungarian registrations, 100,000 Hungarian refugees had arrived in Hungary from South Transylvania by January 1941. There were also mass expulsions of Romanians across the new border imposed by the Second Vienna Award, especially of Romanian ethnics considered dangerous or presumably hostile to the new regime. By 1st of January 1941, there were a total of 109,532 Romanian refugees from Northern Transylvania. Also, a fall in the total population suggests that a further 40,000 to 50,000 Romanians moved from North Transylvania to South Transylvania, including refugees who were omitted from the official registration for various reasons. Additionally, Hungarian gains by assimilation were balanced by losses for other groups of native speakers, such as Jews. In Máramaros and Szatmár Counties, dozens of settlements had many people who had declared themselves as Romanian but now identified themselves as Hungarian although they had not spoken any Hungarian even in 1910. By 1944, when King Michael's Coup turned Romania against the Axis, Romania had over 500,000 refugees from Northern Transylvania.

Massacres
After the occupation of Northern Transylvania in the autumn of 1940, the Romanian population was targeted for reprisal actions by Hungarian nationalists. Military abuses, some cases, illegal arrests, torture, lynchings, summary executions, and the aggressive arrogance of the representatives of the new administrative structures occurred.

Romanian statistics on abuses committed by Hungarian authorities 
In a statistical report of the State Secretariat for Nationalities, from Bucharest, on the situation in Northern Transylvania during August 30 1940 and November 1 1941, 919 murders, 1,126 maimings, 4,126 beatings, 15,893 arrests, 124 desecrations, 78 and 447 collective and individual devastations are mentioned. A few days after the installation, the occupation authorities started deporting the Romanians to the camps. According to a report by the camp commander in the town of Püspökladány, it turns out that 1,315 Romanians were interned in that camp alone in September 1940, well above its maximum capacity. Consequently, that same month, other camps were established at Someșeni and  Floresti, near Cluj Napoca. Cluj-Napoca, Cluj County Prefecture fund.

There were also mass expulsions of Romanians across the new border imposed by the Second Vienna Award, especially of Romanian ethnics considered dangerous or presumably hostile to the new regime. Beginning in 1940, the expulsions were practiced until 1944, when, in September and October, the Hungarian authorities were expelled by the Soviet and Romanian military units. Until January 1, 1941, there were a total of 109,532 Romanian refugees, of which 11,957 were Transylvanians expelled by the Hungarian authorities (including cases of ethnic Hungarians not recognized as Hungarians).

A statistical covering the period September 1, 1940 and December 1, 1943 indicates a total of 218,919 expelled persons. "George Baritiu" Cultural-Scientific Society,  History of Romania. Transilvania , vol. II, cap. VII  Transylvania in the Second World War , George Baritiu Publishing House, Cluj-Napoca, 1997, page 24  This included numerous refugees who left their localities of residence out of fear of the new Hungarian administration. On August 23, 1944, when King Michael's Coup turned Romania against the Axis and the struggle for the liberation of Northern Transylvania began, there were over 500,000 people from the ceded territory based on the Second Vienna Award in Romania.

During this period, Romanian schools and churches also suffered. On the territory of the ceded Transylvania, there were (on August 30, 1940) 1,666 Romanian-language elementary schools and 67 high school, vocational and higher education units. At the beginning of the 1941/1942 school year, the number of primary schools decreased by 792 units, and in 1940/1941 there was only one high school with Romanian as the language of instruction - the one in Năsăud - and only "seven" Romanian sections within high schools with another language of instruction.

The reactions of the Hungarians to the atrocities committed under the Hungarian occupation 
The Hungarians of Transylvania welcomed the decisions of the Second Vienna Award, because they considered it a remedy for the Trianon injustice, hoping that at the end of the war, Hitler would give back to Horthy the whole of Transylvania, however Romania was an allied country at that time. Numerous ethnic Hungarians participated, along with the military, in the massacres against the Romanian population. They devastated, desecrated and demolished the foundations of Romanian churches, especially in the lands inhabited by Szeklers.  In addition, they robbed and set fire to the homes of Romanians or tortured and killed Romanians. However, in a few cases, there were also Hungarian locals who were involved in rescuing Romanian families. Among them is the case of Iosif Gáll, who saved several Romanians from death during the Treznea Massacre. A testimony in this regard is that of Gavril Butcovan, one of the survivors of the drama in Ip commune, Sălaj:

There were cases in which Hungarian locals fell victim trying to help the Romanians. Among them was the maid Sarolta Juhász from Mureșenii de Câmpie, who was killed along with the entire family of the town's priest Bujor.

List of massacres: 
 Nușfalău massacre
 Treznea massacre
 Sărmașu massacre
 Ip massacre
 Cerișa massacre
 Marca massacre
 Brețcu massacre
 Mureșenii de Câmpie massacre
 Ciumărna massacre
 Zalău massacre
 Band, Grebeniș, Oroiu massacre
 Tărian massacre
 Prundu Bârgăului massacre
 Moisei massacre
 Răchitiș massacre
 Turda massacre

Hungarian rule
Hungary held Northern Transylvania from September 1940 to October 1944. In 1940 ethnic disturbances between Hungarians and Romanians continued after some incidents following the entrance of the Hungarian Army, culminating in massacres at Treznea and Ip in the first two weeks approximately 1000 Romanians perished.

Five days after the Second Vienna Award, on September 5 1940, at 7.00, the first Hungarian military unit crossed the border at Sighetul Marmației. Two Hungarian armies entered the territory of annexed Transylvania: First Army - with a force of 208,000 soldiers. It operated in the northeastern part of Transylvania. Second Army - with a staff of 102,000 soldiers. It operated in the Oradea - Cluj area.

On the first day, the main occupied cities were Carei, Satu Mare, Sighetul Marmației and Ocna Șugatag. Nine stages of progress were established, each over a distance of 40-80 kilometers. The last localities taken over, on September 13 1940, were Sfântu Gheorghe and Târgu Secuiesc. The advance of Hungarian units took place in peaceful conditions, with only a few scattered incidents with Romanian soldiers retreating to southern Transylvania. The Hungarian army was greeted enthusiastically by the majority of the Hungarian population, which was documented in detail in the 1940 films, with the parade of military units, as well as Horthy riding on gray horse, marching through the main cities of Northern Transylvania.

After some ethnic Hungarian groups considered unreliable or insecure were sacked/expelled from Southern Transylvania, the Hungarian officials also regularly expelled some Romanian groups from Northern Transylvania. Also, many Hungarians and Romanians fled or chose to opt between the two countries. There was a mass exodus; over 100,000 people on both sides of the ethnic and political borders relocated. This continued until 1944.

On March 19, 1944, following the occupation of Hungary by the Nazi Germany army through Operation Margarethe, Northern Transylvania came under German military occupation. Like the Jews living in Hungary, most of the Jews in Northern Transylvania (about 150,000) were sent to concentration camps during World War II, a move that was facilitated by local military and civilians. Following several decrees of the Hungarian government and high-level consultations at a meeting on April 26 with László Endre in Szatmárnémeti (now Satu Mare), the deportation of the Jews was decided. On May 3, authorities in Dés (now Dej) launched the action of ghettoization of Jews in the Bungăr forest, where 3,700 Jews from Dej and 4,100 Jews from other localities in the area were imprisoned. During the operation of the Dej ghetto, Jews were mistreated, tortured, and starved. The deportation of the Jews to the Nazi death camps was done with freight wagons, in three stages: the first transport on May 28 when 3,150 Jews were deported; the second on June 6, when 3,360 Jews were deported; the third on June 8, when the last 1,364 Jews were deported. Most of those deported were exterminated in the Auschwitz–Birkenau camp, with just over 800 deportees surviving. The Kolozsvár Ghetto (in what is now Cluj-Napoca) was initiated on May 3, and was put under the command of László Urbán, the local police chief. The ghetto, comprising about 18,000 Jews, was liquidated in six transports to Auschwitz, with the first deportation occurring on May 25, and the last one on June 9. Other ghettoes that were set up in Northern Transylvania during this period were the Oradea ghetto (the largest one, with 35,000 Jews), the Baia Mare ghetto, the Bistrița ghetto, the Cehei ghetto, the Reghin ghetto, the Satu Mare ghetto, and the Sfântu Gheorghe ghetto.

After King Michael's Coup of August 23, 1944, Romania left the Axis and joined the Allies. Thus, the Romanian Army fought Nazi Germany and its allies in Romania – regaining Northern Transylvania – and further on, in German occupied Hungary and in Slovakia and Protectorate of Bohemia and Moravia, for instance, in the Budapest Offensive, the Siege of Budapest, and the Prague Offensive.

The Second Vienna Award was voided by the Allied Commission through The Armistice Agreement with Romania (September 12, 1944) whose Article 19 stipulated the following: "The Allied Governments regard the decision of the Vienna award regarding Transylvania as null and void and are agreed that Transylvania (or the greater part thereof) should be returned to Romania, subject to confirmation at the peace settlement, and the Soviet Government agrees that Soviet forces shall take part for this purpose in joint military operations with Romania against Germany and Hungary."

The territory was occupied by the Allied forces by late October 1944. On October 25, at the Battle of Carei, units of the Romanian 4th Army under the command of General Gheorghe Avramescu took control of the last piece of the territory ceded in 1940 to Hungary. However, due to the activities of Romanian paramilitary forces, the Soviets expelled the Romanian administration from Northern Transylvania in November 1944 and did not allow them to return until March 1945.

On 20 January 1945, Hungary accepted the obligation to evacuate all Hungarian troops and officials from the territory, to retreat to its pre-war borders, and to repeal all legislative and administrative regulations in connection with the incorporation of the territory.

The 1947 Paris Peace Treaty reaffirmed the borders between Romania and Hungary, as originally defined in the Treaty of Trianon, 27 years earlier, thus confirming the return of Northern Transylvania to Romania.

Geography

Northern Transylvania is a diverse region, both in terms of landscape and population. It contains both largely rural areas (such as Bistrița-Năsăud County) as well as major cities, such as Cluj-Napoca, Oradea, Târgu Mureș, Baia Mare, and Satu Mare. Centers of Hungarian culture, such as Miercurea Ciuc and Sfântu Gheorghe, are also part of the region. An important tourist destination is Maramureș County, an area known for its beautiful rural scenery, local small woodwork, including wooden churches, its craftwork industry, and its original rural architecture.

See also
 Southern Transylvania
 Romanian People's Tribunals
 Northern Transylvania Holocaust Memorial Museum
 Magyar Autonomous Region

References

External links
 Map

20th century in Transylvania
Historical regions in Romania
Romania in World War II
History of Transylvania